The 1982 Irish Masters was the eighth edition of the professional invitational snooker tournament, which took place from 24 to 28 March 1982. The tournament was played at Goffs in Kill, County Kildare, and featured twelve professional players.

Terry Griffiths won the title for the third year in a row, beating Steve Davis 9–5 in the final.

Main draw

References

Irish Masters
Irish Masters
Irish Masters
Irish Masters